Brothers & Sisters is the ninth studio album by pioneering jazz group Soil & "Pimp" Sessions, from Japan. It was released on September 3, 2014.The album went back to the group's roots.

Track listing

Credits
Performed and arranged by Soil & "Pimp" Sessions
Toasting [Agitator] – Shacho
Saxophone – Motoharu
Trumpet – Tabu Zombie
Piano – Josei
Bass – Akita Goldman
Drums – Midorin

References

2014 albums
Soil & "Pimp" Sessions albums